Omø is a Danish island in the Great Belt. Some of the island's natural features are its lake and its bog; also, it is characterized for its varied bird life.

Omø maintains a lighthouse and cabins, along with a campsite, in order to invite tourism.

See also
Nearby islands: Zealand, Agersø, Glaenø, Vejrø, Fejø, Femø, Lolland.
Nearby cities: Korsør, Skælskør, Slagelse, Næstved.

Notes

References
Tageo.com, "VESTSJAELLAND DENMARK Geography Population" (coordinates), 2007, webpage: Tageo-index.
Denmark Postal codes, webpage: Postnumre-DK.
Tele.dk Denmark detailed road map, webpage: Tele-DK-Danmark.

External links
Omø's official website  
Archipelago's entry for Omø

Danish islands in the Baltic
Islands of Denmark
Geography of Slagelse Municipality